A variable prepaid forward contract is an investment strategy that allows a shareholder with a concentrated stock holding to generate liquidity for diversification or other purposes.  Additionally, the shareholder will receive cash in hand without paying the capital gains taxes that would apply to a security disposal.

The PVF allows the investor to receive an up-front payment (typically, 75-85% market value) in exchange for delivery of a variable number of shares or cash in the future.  Since the contract establishes floor and threshold prices that govern how many shares (or cash equivalent) are returned at a given market price, the investor will be protected against downside risk below the floor while enjoying appreciation potential up to the threshold.

See also
Tax shelter

References

External links
 
 

Taxation in the United States